Georges Mandel (5 June 1885 – 7 July 1944) was a French journalist, politician, and French Resistance leader.

Early life
Born Louis George Rothschild in Chatou, Yvelines, he was the son of a tailor and his wife. His family was Jewish, originally from Alsace. They moved into France in 1871 to preserve their French citizenship when Alsace-Lorraine was annexed by the German Empire at the end of the Franco-Prussian War.

Early career
Mandel began working life as a journalist for L'Aurore, a literary and socialist newspaper founded in 1897 by Émile Zola and Georges Clemenceau. They notably defended Alfred Dreyfus during the Dreyfus Affair of the 1890s. The paper continued until 1916.

As Minister of the Interior, Clemenceau later brought Mandel into politics as his aide. Described as "Clemenceau's right-hand man," Mandel helped Clemenceau control the press and the trade union movement during the First World War. Clemenceau said of him: "I fart and Mandel stinks".

Inter-war period
In 1919 Mandel was elected to the Chamber of Deputies from Gironde. In September that year, he was delegated to try to draw the government out of its noncommittal attitude regarding the system of proportional representation adopted by both houses of the National Assembly earlier in the year. He lost his seat when the Cartel des Gauches swept the 1924 elections, but was reelected in 1928. By  1932, he had become the Chairman of the Chamber's universal suffrage committee. Its actions led to passage of a bill enfranchising women, although the proposal was rejected by the Senate.

In 1934, Mandel was appointed Minister of Posts (1934–1936) and oversaw the first official television transmission in French.

Mandel was an economic conservative and an outspoken opponent of Nazism and Fascism. In the 1930s, he played a similar role to that of Winston Churchill in the United Kingdom, highlighting the dangers posed by the rise of Adolf Hitler in Germany. He opposed Pierre Laval's plan to partition Ethiopia following its invasion by Benito Mussolini's Italy (the Second Italo–Abyssinian War of 1935–1936). Mandel advocated a military alliance with the Soviet Union and opposed the Munich Agreement.

During the 1936 Albert Sarraut government, Mandel served as both Minister of Posts and High Commissioner for Alsace and Lorraine. After the fall of the Popular Front government, he served as Minister of Colonies from 1938 to 18 May 1940, when Premier Paul Reynaud appointed him briefly Minister of the Interior.

German invasion
In September 1939, after the outbreak of the German-Polish War, Mandel argued that the French Army should fight an offensive war. Mandel was accused by some on the right of being a warmonger and of placing his Jewish ancestry above France's interests.

Mandel opposed the Armistice with the rapidly advancing Germans. He was an Anglophile and had inherited Clemenceau's vicious tongue – he had particular contempt for Albert Lebrun, the President of the Republic, and for Deputy Prime Minister Camille Chautemps – but in the view of historian Julian Jackson he was a natural deputy, not a leader, and did not carry the political weight to oppose those - including France's two leading soldiers, Philippe Pétain and Maxime Weygand - who favoured an armistice. The British general Edward Spears, Churchill's military liaison officer, compared him to a fish, but a likeable one.

Winston S. Churchill, in his book "The Second World War: Their Finest Hour," describes Mandel as a gallant public servant under the heading "The Great Mandel." Recounting his 2 o'clock luncheon with the man during Churchill's last trip to France for four years "almost to the day" on June 13, 1940 his account was very favorable, and is as follows:

"We then returned to the Prefecture, where Mandel, Minister of the Interior, awaited us. This faithful former secretary of Clemenceau, and a bearer forward of his life's message, seemed in the best spirits. He was energy and defiance personified. His luncheon, an attractive chicken, was uneaten on the tray before him. He was a ray of sunshine. He had a telephone in each hand, through which he was constantly giving orders and decisions. His ideas were simple: fight on to the end in France, in order to cover the largest possible movement into Africa. This was the last time I saw this valiant Frenchman. The restored French Republic rightly shot to death the hirelings who murdered him. His memory is honored by his countrymen and their allies."

On 16 June 1940 in Bordeaux (the day Reynaud resigned and Pétain was asked to form a government), Mandel was arrested but released shortly afterwards, with apologies, upon urgent representations to Premier Pétain made jointly and in person by Édouard Herriot (President of the Chamber of Deputies) and Jules Jeanneney (President of the Senate). Spears offered Mandel the chance to leave on his plane on the morning of 17 June, together with Charles de Gaulle. Mandel declined, saying: "You fear for me because I am a Jew. Well, it is just because I am a Jew that I will not go tomorrow; it would look as though I was afraid, as if I was running away."

Mandel sought to persuade Lebrun, Herriot, Jeanneney, and as many members of the Cabinet as possible to travel to French North Africa, to continue the fight against the Germans. Only 25 other deputies and one senator embarked with Mandel on the Massilia on 21 June, including Pierre Mendès France and the former Popular Front education minister, Jean Zay.

Arrest, detention and death

Mandel, notwithstanding his criticism for the Third Republic, was one of the parliamentarians that on 10 July 1940 rejected the Vichy regime. Only 57 deputies and 23 senators, dubbed "the eighty", refused to suspend the constitutional laws of France and to give full powers to the government of  Marechal Petain, against 569 parliamentarians that supported those proposals.

Mandel was arrested on 8 August 1940 in French Morocco by General Charles Noguès on the orders of Pierre Laval, Prime Minister of the Vichy government. He was conveyed to the Château de Chazeron via Fort du Portalet, where Paul Reynaud, Édouard Daladier and General Maurice Gamelin were also being held prisoner. Churchill tried unsuccessfully to arrange Mandel's rescue. He described Mandel as "the first resister" and is believed to have preferred him over Charles de Gaulle to lead the Free French Forces. Following pressure from the Germans and the Riom Trial, all four were sentenced to life imprisonment on 7 November 1941.

In November 1942, after the German Army moved into unoccupied France and took it over to counter the threat from the Allies, who had just landed in North Africa, the French government at Vichy transferred Mandel and Reynaud to the Gestapo upon their request. The Gestapo deported Mandel to KZ Oranienburg, and then to KZ Buchenwald, where he was held with the French politician Léon Blum.

In 1944 the German Ambassador in Paris, Otto Abetz suggested to Laval that Mandel, Blum, and Reynaud should be executed by the Vichy government in retaliation for the assassination of Philippe Henriot, Minister of Propaganda, by the Algiers Committee, the Communist Maquis of the Resistance. Mandel was returned to Paris on 4 July 1944, supposedly as a hostage. While being transferred from one prison to another, he was captured by the Milice, the paramilitary Vichy force. Three days later, the Milice took Mandel to the Forest of Fontainebleau, where they executed him. He was buried at Passy Cemetery.

Laval was appalled and protested that he could not condone the execution: "I have no blood on my hands...and no responsibility for these events." He added that the members of the Vichy Cabinet were unanimous "in favour of refusing to hand over any hostages in future or to condone reprisals of this nature." Both Laval and Robert Brasillach, a French Fascist who had called for Mandel's trial or execution, were ultimately executed in 1945.

Legacy and honours
A monument to Mandel was erected near the site of his execution, next to the road connecting Fontainebleau to Nemours.

Avenue Georges Mandel, a wide avenue in Paris commencing at the Place du Trocadero, is named in his honor.

Representation in other media
Nicolas Sarkozy wrote a biography, Georges Mandel, moine de la politique, 1994. It was adapted as a French television film, The Last Summer, which starred Jacques Villeret in the title role.

Book

Discovery of art looted from Mandel by Nazis in the Gurlitt collection 
Thomas Couture’s Portrait of a Seated Woman, (c.1850-1855) which was discovered in the Gurlitt trove was identified as having belonged to Georges Mandel from  a small hole in the canvas. It was restituted to Mandel's heirs in 2019.

References

External links
 Mandel on "Alsatian Judaism" (in French)
 

1885 births
1944 deaths
People from Chatou
Alsatian Jews
Politicians from Île-de-France
Jewish French politicians
Republican Independents
French Ministers of Overseas France
French interior ministers
French Ministers of Posts, Telegraphs, and Telephones
Members of the 12th Chamber of Deputies of the French Third Republic
Members of the 14th Chamber of Deputies of the French Third Republic
Members of the 15th Chamber of Deputies of the French Third Republic
Members of the 16th Chamber of Deputies of the French Third Republic
French male non-fiction writers
People associated with the Dreyfus affair
French Resistance members
Jews in the French resistance
Executed politicians
Politicians who died in the Holocaust
French civilians killed in World War II
Executed people from Île-de-France
Burials at Passy Cemetery
20th-century French journalists
20th-century French male writers
French Jews who died in the Holocaust